Bianor angulosus, is a species of spider of the genus Bianor. It is found in Sri Lanka, India to China, Vietnam, and Indonesia.

References

Salticidae
Spiders of Asia
Spiders described in 1879